Ugochi (Ugo) Daniels has been the Chief of Staff at the UN Agency for Palestine Refugees (UNRWA) since September 2020. On 31 May 2021, the International Organization for Migration (IOM) announced the selection by Director General Antonio Vitorino of two new Deputy Directors General during a special session of the IOM Member State Council in Geneva. Ugochi Florence Daniels will assume the position of Deputy Director General for Operations as of 1 September 2021. On 10 September 2018, she was appointed the UN Resident Coordinator and Designated Official for Security in the Islamic Republic of Iran.

Careers in United Nations and United States Government Agencies 

Ugochi Daniels is the Chief of the Humanitarian and Fragile Contexts Branch in the Programme Division of UNFPA since 2013. Daniels joined UNFPA in 2002 as the Deputy Program Manager of the African Youth Alliance. In 2007, she became the Deputy Representative in Nepal and in 2010, Daniels was appointed Representative in the Philippines where she helped to ensure that partnership with humanitarian agencies was at the heart of UNFPA's response to natural disasters. In 2012, Daniels served as the Acting Resident Coordinator and Humanitarian Coordinator of the Philippines. Prior to joining UNFPA, Daniels worked with USAID's Nigeria Office between 1999 and 2002, serving both in the Office of Transition Initiatives and later as a Monitoring, Evaluation and Information Specialist. She focused on institutional strengthening, networks and partnerships, women's access to health services, and women's participation in political processes.

Further careers
 2021 – present: Deputy Director General of Operations at the International Organization for Migration (IOM).
 2020 – 2021: Chief of Staff at the UN Agency for Palestine Refugees (UNRWA).
 2018 – 2020: UN Resident Coordinator and Designated Official for Security in the Islamic Republic of Iran.
 2013 – 2018: Chief, Humanitarian and Fragile Contexts Branch, UNFPA Headquarters, New York.
 2010 – 2013: UNFPA Country Representative, Philippines.
 2007 – 2010: UNFPA Deputy Representative, Nepal.
 2002 – 2007: Programme Specialist, Africa Division, UNFPA Headquarters, New York.
 1999 – 2001: USAID Monitoring and Evaluation Information Specialist, Nigeria.
 1996 – 1999: MIS Manager, Investment and Portfolio Management Services Ltd., Lagos, Nigeria.
 1992 – 1996: Systems Analyst, Cedar Group of Companies, Lagos, Nigeria.
 1987 – 1990: Evaluation Officer, Sigma Systems, Lagos, Nigeria.
 1984 – 1986: Lecturer II, Nigerian Defence Academy, Kaduna, Nigeria.

See also 

 United Nations Population Fund
 Reproductive Health Supplies Coalition
 Sandbæk Report

References 

Living people
Year of birth missing (living people)